"My First Kiss" is a song recorded by American electronic duo 3OH!3. The song was written by Lukasz Gottwald, Sean Foreman, Nathaniel Motte and Benny Blanco, and was produced by Dr. Luke, and Blanco for their third studio album, Streets of Gold (2010). The song was released as the lead single from Streets of Gold on May 4, 2010. The song's inspiration is about going through one's first kiss and exploring further parts of a relationship.

Critical reception of the song was mixed. Though the song is 3OH!3's song, Kesha's feature on the track was praised by multiple critics for her strong delivery while 3OH!3's performance was met with mixed reviews, some calling them irritating. The song achieved commercial success by reaching the top ten in Canada, the United Kingdom and the United States, while charting within the top forty in multiple other countries. The song performed greatest in the United States reaching a peak of number nine on the Billboard Hot 100 and has gone on to sell 1,800,000 copies as of 2016. The music video for "My First Kiss" follows a similar theme to its title. The dominant scenes of the video feature people kissing in front of multicolored backings with 3OH!3's logo present in much of the scenes. The song was performed on Regis and Kelly.

Ashley Tisdale sang the parts of Kesha with the duo 3OH!3 in the episode "Worried Baby Blues" on her television series, Hellcats, and the original version of the song used in other episode "I Say a Little Prayer" of the same series. The song was used in the 2012 film American Reunion, and was also included on the official soundtrack of the movie.

Background and composition

"My First Kiss" was written by Sean Foreman and Nathaniel Motte alongside Dr. Luke and Benny Blanco. The song was produced by Dr. Luke and Benny Blanco with vocal editing done by Emily Wright. While being interviewed by MTV, Foreman explained the song's inspiration: "The song is about a girl you really like, and the story line of going through your first kiss with a girl to exploring further parts of the relationship." While composing the song, Foreman and Motte decided that they needed to add a female to the song. Kesha, who had worked with Blanco and Luke, was asked to participate in the song and later came into the studio to contribute her lines.

"My First Kiss" is an upbeat dominant electropop song that incorporates elements of power pop. The song features elements of "electro bleeps" and a brief snippets of "beatbox sounds". Present throughout the song, are sounds of kissing noises in between verses. According to sheet music published at Musicnotes, the song is written in common time with a moderate beat rate of 138 beats per minute. The song is written in the key of E minor and the vocal range in the song spans from the note of E3 to the note of B4. According to Sara D Anderson of AOL Radio, Kesha plays the role of a boy's first crush "who decides to not let him go past first base: 'She don't wanna give it up / Baby I can get it up / If I had it my way / Hey! I'll make you say.'"

Critical reception

Robert Copsey of Digital Spy met the song with a negative review. Copsey commended Kesha's work throughout the song calling her "cheeky (and a tad tipsy)". 3OH!3 however, were called "simply irritating". Copsey commented that the song was simply "another shouty electro-hop nugget that's as rowdy and intimidating as the school bully after a can of Red Bull". Fraser McAlpine from BBC was also negative in his review of the song. Like Copsey, McAlpine complimented Kesha's verses in the song noting it was his favorite part of the song, "The best bit is the playground rhyme, and Kesha's slurry delivery beats that of the '3 by MILES. It's probably cos she's flirting and they're shouting." He went on to criticize the song for being too similar to "Don't Trust Me," commenting, "There's not a lot in it between this and 'Don't Trust Me', musically or thematically speaking." McAlpine went on the give the song two out of five stars.

Bill Lamb of About.com met the song with a positive review giving the single four out of a possible five stars. Lamb wrote "[though] part of me wants to find this terribly annoying" that hardly matters as "3OH!3 and Kesha are probably the most gifted artists of the moment performing irresistibly catchy music". His conclusion of the song was, "like it or not, the 3OH!3 boys are back, and it looks like they plan to stay awhile."

Commercial performance
In the United States, "My First Kiss" entered the US Billboard Hot 100 on the issue date titled May 22, 2010, at number nine where the single reached its peak. The song went on to sell over 500,000 copies in 2010 in the United States and has since been certified gold by the Recording Industry Association of America (RIAA). As of 2016, the song has now sold 1,800,000 copies in the United States. In the same week, "My First Kiss" entered the Canadian Hot 100 at number seven where it also reached its peak. In October 2010 the single was certified platinum by the Canadian Recording Industry Association (CRIA) for sales of 80,000 units.

Internationally, "My First Kiss" entered the Australian charts at number twenty-five. After steadily ascending the charts for seven weeks, the single reached a peak of thirteen where it stayed for two weeks. The song was listed on the chart for a total of seventeen weeks and has since received platinum certification by the Australian Recording Industry Association (ARIA) for sales of 70,000 units. In the United Kingdom, the single entered and peaked at number seven on its first week on the chart.

Music video
The music video for "My First Kiss" was filmed in New York City by director, Isaac Ravishankara. The song's music video is relative to the song's theme: kissing. Foreman explained, "[And] the video is a play on kissing in general, and lips, and getting close up to a bunch of lips, and people coming out of mouths and just, like, really cool transitions." The video follows a similar theme that is relative to the song's title, "My First Kiss". It features a lot of people (punks, teachers, sailors, soldiers, lesbians, nerds, an elderly couple and hirsute rockers) "smooching, kissing, and making out." The video is made up of different scenes all using multi-colored backdrops as the video's dominant backing. The main scenes present are of "3OH!3 bouncing around and throw[ing] punches at the camera" while singing their versus and occasional close-ups of different pairs of lips that are mouthing different lyrics of the song. Kesha is also present throughout the video, mainly on her verses where she is seen in close-ups of her lips and dancing around the screen on the chorus.

At the end, the camera quickly zooms out to reveal that 3OH!3 are inside Ke$ha's mouth. She then eats them before kissing at the camera.

James Montgomery from MTV News reviewed the video for "My First Kiss" positively. Montgomery commented on how simple the song's video was but noted that wasn't a negative, he commented, "like pretty much everything 3OH!3 do, there's an undeniable charm to both the song and the video. Perhaps it's the power-tool chorus, or the "ooh-ooh-ooh" vocal harmonies. Maybe it's Kesha's sexy ass. Or maybe I just like watching a whole bunch of people lock lips. The whole thing is a lot of fun. It gets in your head. And hey, it's the summer — school's out, and gleefully stupid is in."

Live performance
The song was performed live on March 27, 2010, alongside Kesha.

The song was performed live on Regis and Kelly on July 30, 2010.

Track listing

Digital Download
"My First Kiss" (Feat. Kesha) – 3:12

My First Kiss (Remix) – EP
"My First Kiss" (Gucci Mane Remix) (Feat. Kesha) – 3:12
"My First Kiss" (Chuckie Extended Version) (Feat. Kesha) – 7:34
"My First Kiss" (Innerpartysystem Remix) (Feat. Kesha) – 5:07
"My First Kiss" (Feat. Kesha) (Video) – 3:20

UK My First Kiss – EP
"My First Kiss" (Feat. Kesha) – 3:12
"My First Kiss" (Chuckie Remix) (Feat. Kesha) – 3:39
"My First Kiss" (Chuckie Extended Version) (Feat. Kesha) – 7:34
"My First Kiss" (Innerpartysystem Remix) (Feat. Kesha) – 5:07
"My First Kiss" (Skeet Remix) – 4:42

Credits and personnel
Songwriting – Dr. Luke, Sean Foreman, Nathaniel Motte and Benny Blanco
Production – Dr. Luke and Benny Blanco
Engineering – Emily Wright, Sam Holland and Benny Blanco
Instruments and programming – Dr. Luke, Nathaniel Motte and Benny Blanco
Additional vocals – Dr. Luke and Benny Blanco
Vocal Editing – Emily Wright

Source

Charts and certifications

Charts

Year-end charts

Certifications

Release history

References

External links

2010 singles
Kesha songs
3OH!3 songs
Songs written by Dr. Luke
Songs written by Benny Blanco
Song recordings produced by Dr. Luke
Song recordings produced by Benny Blanco
2010 songs
Songs written by Nathaniel Motte
Songs about kissing
Songs written by Sean Foreman